Annika Billström (born 7 April 1956) is a Swedish social democratic politician. She was the first female mayor of Stockholm, serving between 2004 and 2006.

Background
Billström's background was as the chief financial officer of Handels, the Swedish Commercial Employees' Union between 1987 and 1994. She was elected to the Stockholm City Council serving as road commissioner in 1994–98 and commissioner in opposition from 1998 to 2002.

Mayoralty
Billström was appointed mayor of Stockholm in 2002 by the City Council after winning the municipal election and forming a majority with the Left party and the Green party. Two of her decisions as mayor in particular were controversial, the first being the new entry toll that was introduced for vehicles entering the centre of Stockholm. The toll was decided on a state-level to ensure support by the Green Party for the newly formed Social democratic cabinet and Billström was forced to honor this agreement even though she had promised not to in the run up to the 2002 election. In 2006 a referendum was held to let the people of Stockholm determine whether they wanted the entry tolls permanented or not, with more than 51% voting yes. The entry tolls were thus enforced by the conservative majority ruling 2006–10. Billström's other decision was to turn a central building in Stockholm (Skatteskrapan på Södermalm) into student housing, which was criticised for being expensive for taxpayers.

After losing the election in 2006, Billström stepped down and was replaced by Carin Jämtin.

References

1956 births
Living people
Mayors of Stockholm
People from Härnösand
Municipal commissioners of Sweden
Swedish Social Democratic Party politicians
Swedish trade unionists
Swedish bloggers
Writers from Stockholm
Women mayors of places in Sweden
Swedish women bloggers
21st-century Swedish women politicians
20th-century Swedish women politicians
20th-century Swedish politicians